Bob Hart is a multi-instrumentalist currently living in Brooklyn, NY. He is a member of the chamber-pop band Clare & the Reasons, and has played with Debbie Harry (Blondie), Van Dyke Parks, Spiraling and others.

External links
Clare & the Reasons' website

Year of birth missing (living people)
Living people
American bass guitarists
Guitarists from New York (state)
American male bass guitarists
Place of birth missing (living people)